The 1994 Maryland Terrapins football team represented the University of Maryland in the 1994 NCAA Division I-A football season. In their third season under head coach Mark Duffner, the Terrapins compiled a 4–7 record, finished in seventh place in the Atlantic Coast Conference, and were outscored by their opponents 326 to 270. The team's statistical leaders included Scott Milanovich with 2,394 passing yards, Allen Williams with 649 rushing yards, and Geroy Simon with 891 receiving yards.

Schedule

Roster

References

Maryland
Maryland Terrapins football seasons
Maryland Terrapins football